Todd Fischer (born August 23, 1969) is an American professional golfer.

Fischer was born in Columbus, Ohio. He played college golf at the University of San Francisco, where he won two events.

Fischer played on the Nationwide Tour and PGA Tour from 2001 to 2011. On the Nationwide Tour, 2001–02 and 2007–11, his best finish was a win at the 2002 Fort Smith Classic. On the PGA Tour, 2003–06, He had four third-place finishes: 3rd at the 2003 Greater Hartford Open, T-3 at the 2004 B.C. Open, T-3 at the 2004 Valero Texas Open, and 3rd at 2005 Reno-Tahoe Open.

Amateur wins
1992 Pacific Coast Amateur

Professional wins (6)

Nationwide Tour wins (1)

Other wins (5)
1998 Long Beach Open
1999 California State Open
2000 Utah Open, Long Beach Open
2009 Northern California Open

See also
2002 Buy.com Tour graduates

References

External links

American male golfers
PGA Tour golfers
Korn Ferry Tour graduates
Golfers from Columbus, Ohio
Golfers from California
San Francisco Dons men's golfers
People from Pleasanton, California
1969 births
Living people